Dustin Jake May (born September 6, 1997) is an American professional baseball pitcher for the Los Angeles Dodgers of Major League Baseball (MLB). He was selected by the Dodgers in the third round of the 2016 Major League Baseball draft, and made his MLB debut in 2019.

Early life and amateur career
May graduated from Northwest High School in Justin, Texas. He was selected by the Los Angeles Dodgers in the third round of the 2016 Major League Baseball Draft. He was committed to play college baseball for the Texas Tech Red Raiders, but chose to sign with the Dodgers for a $1 million signing bonus, forgoing his commitment.

Professional career

Minor Leagues
After signing, May made his professional debut with the Arizona League Dodgers, and spent the whole season there, posting an 0-1 record with a 3.86 ERA and 34 strikeouts in 30 innings pitched. In 2017, he played for both the Great Lakes Loons and the Rancho Cucamonga Quakes, compiling a combined 9-6 record, 3.63 ERA, and a 1.15 WHIP in 25 games (24 starts) between the two clubs. In 2018 for the Quakes he was selected to the post-season California League all-star team. On September 14, he started the Drillers title clinching playoff game where he allowed two runs in five innings. In 23 total starts between Rancho Cucamonga and Tulsa, he was 9-5 with a 3.39 ERA.

May began 2019 with Tulsa. He was selected to the mid-season Texas League All-Star Game and the All-Star Futures Game. He was promoted to the AAA Oklahoma City Dodgers on June 27. He was a combined 6-5 with a 4.13 ERA as he struck out 110 batters in 106 innings.

Los Angeles Dodgers

2019 season
May was called up to the majors on August 2, 2019, and made his major league debut for the Dodgers as the starting pitcher against the San Diego Padres. He pitched 5 innings, allowing four runs (three earned) on nine hits with three strikeouts. On August 13, May picked up his first big league win against the Miami Marlins after pitching 5 innings, allowing one run on three hits with five strikeouts. He finished the season appearing in 14 games for the Dodgers (four starts), with a 2–3 record, a 3.63 ERA, and 32 strikeouts with only five walks. He also pitched in 3 innings across two games for the Dodgers in the National League Division Series (NLDS) against the Washington Nationals, allowing one run on three hits.

2020 season
May was selected to start for the Dodgers on Opening Day in the pandemic-shortened 2020 season after Clayton Kershaw injured his back before the game. May became the youngest opening day starter for the Dodgers since Fernando Valenzuela in 1981. He picked up his first win of the season on August 4, when he struck out eight in six innings against the San Diego Padres and appeared in 12 games (10 starts) with a 3–1 record and 2.57 ERA in 56 innings. His 99.1 mph-average four-seam fastball was the fastest four-seamer of any major league pitcher for the 2020 season. He pitched three scoreless innings over two games in the 2020 NLDS against the San Diego Padres and allowed two earned runs in 4 innings over three games against the Atlanta Braves in the National League Championship Series (NLCS). May pitched in two games of the 2020 World Series, working three total innings and allowing three runs to score on five hits.

2021 season
May made five starts in 2021, with a 1–1 record and 2.74 ERA. On May 1, he tore his UCL while throwing a pitch, requiring season ending Tommy John surgery, which he underwent on May 12.

2022 season
On August 20, 2022, May made his first start after returning from his recovery and struck out nine while allowing only one hit in five scoreless innings against the Miami Marlins. He pitched a total of six games for the Dodgers, with a 2–3 record and 4.50 ERA before he was placed on the injured list with lower back tightness on September 24, ending his regular season.

2023 season
May signed a $1.675 million contract with the Dodgers in his first year of salary arbitration.

Pitching style 
His main pitches are a two-seam fastball with sinker-like movement, which averages at over 98 mph, a cutter, a curveball and a four-seam fastball. He was ranked 4th amongst starting pitchers in lateral movement in 2020, which is rare for a pitcher that averages over 93 mph on their two-seam fastballs or sinkers.

Personal life
May is nicknamed "Gingergaard" after his teammate Noah Syndergaard, due to profile and appearance, as well as his red hair.

References

External links

1997 births
Living people
People from Denton County, Texas
Baseball players from Texas
Major League Baseball pitchers
Los Angeles Dodgers players
Arizona League Dodgers players
Great Lakes Loons players
Rancho Cucamonga Quakes players
Tulsa Drillers players
Oklahoma City Dodgers players
Arizona Complex League Dodgers players